Hallgrímskirkja (Church of Hallgrímur) is a Lutheran (Church of Iceland) parish church in Reykjavík, Iceland. Known for its distinctively curved spire and side wings, it has been described as having become an important symbol for Iceland's national identity since its completion in 1986 The church is named after the Icelandic poet and cleric Hallgrímur Pétursson (1614–1674), author of the Passion Hymns.

Description
Situated on the hilltop Skólavörðuholt  near the centre of Reykjavík, the church is one of the city's best-known landmarks and is visible throughout the city. State Architect Guðjón Samúelsson's design of the church was commissioned in 1937. He is said to have designed it to resemble the trap rocks, mountains and glaciers of Iceland's landscape, in particular its columnar basalt "organ pipe" formations (such as those at Svartifoss). The design is similar in style to the expressionist architecture of Grundtvig's Church of Copenhagen, Denmark, completed in 1940, which has been described as a likely influence, alongside the expressionist Kirche am Hohenzollernplatz in Berlin, Germany (completed in 1933).

Architecturally, Hallgrímskirkja consists of three parts: The tower with the distinctly curved side wings which house service facilities, a nave in more traditional architecture, and a sanctuary at the other end of the nave, whose cylindrical shape has been described as evoking Viking war helmets. Hallgrímskirkja also has a 244 ft (74.37 meters) dome.

Inside the church you can light a candle for a dead family member, it costs 100 ISK, to light a candle. (0,6913 USD)

Hallgrímskirkja is best described as a piece of Expressionist architecture because of its tower like exterior, its rejection of traditional styles and its dynamic design. It was heavily influenced by another building, Grundtvigskirken. Like Hallgrímskirkja, Grundtvigskirken, has an organ-like appearance.

It took 41 years to build the church: construction started in 1945 and ended in 1986, but the landmark tower was completed long before the whole church was finished. The crypt beneath the choir was consecrated in 1948, the steeple and wings were completed in 1974, and the nave was consecrated in 1986. At the time of construction, the building was criticized as too old-fashioned and as a blend of different architectural styles. The church was originally intended to be less tall, but the leaders of the Church of Iceland wanted a large spire so as to outshine Landakotskirkja (Landakot's Church), which was the cathedral of the Catholic Church in Iceland.

The church has a bunch of bells at the top, that ring each hour.

The church houses two large pipe organs. The first, a Rieger-Kloss organ was installed in 1946. It was moved to the South Wing when it opened and a new organ was built. The next pipe organ was commissioned from Frobenius in 1985. Soon after, in 1988 the church council decided that the Frobenius pipe organ wasn't big enough and commissioned another from the German organ builder Johannes Klais of Bonn. It has electronic action; the pipes are remote from the four manuals and pedal console. There are 102 ranks, 72 stops and 5275 pipes. Its construction was finished in December 1992.

Einar Jónsson donated the statue of Jesus to the church in 1948, which stands right next to the entrance to the nave. Jesus receives the Holy Spirit after being baptized in the Jordan.

The church is also used as an observation tower. An observer can take a lift up to the viewing deck and view Reykjavík and the surrounding mountains.

The statue of explorer Leif Erikson (c.970 – c.1020) by Alexander Stirling Calder in front of the church predates its construction. It was a gift from the United States in honor of the 1930 Althing Millennial Festival, commemorating the 1000th anniversary of the convening of Iceland's parliament at Þingvellir in 930 AD.

Gallery

References

External links 

  
Hallgrímskirkja on the Icelandic Church Map 

Towers in Iceland
Churches completed in 1986
Churches in Reykjavík
Art Deco architecture
Terminating vistas
Tourist attractions in Reykjavík
Expressionist architecture